Abu'l-Aysh ibn al-Qasim Jannun (Arabic: أبو العيش أحمد بن القاسم كنون) was the twelfth Idrisid ruler and sultan of Morocco. He took over after Al Qasim Gannum in 948 until his death in 954.

His title Abu'l-Aysh means in Arabic "father of rice"; the generous man.

Genealogy

References

Sources
 
 

Idrisid emirs
People from Fez, Morocco
Year of birth unknown
954 deaths
10th-century monarchs in Africa
10th-century Moroccan people
10th-century Arabs